= Tranquila Beach =

Beach in Puerto Vallarta, Jalisco, Mexico

- Beach

- Location within Mexico
- Coordinates: 20°37′39″N 105°13′57″W
- Location: Puerto Vallarta, Jalisco, Mexico

Tranquila Beach (Spanish: "Playa Tranquila") is a beach in Puerto Vallarta, in the Mexican state of Jalisco. The beach neighbors Las Glorias Beach. Condominiums and resorts along the beach include Buganvilias Resort Vacation Club, Costa Club Punta Arena, and Sheraton Buganvilias Resort & Convention Center.
