= Las Glorias Beach =

Beach in Puerto Vallarta, Jalisco, Mexico

- Beach

- Location within Mexico
- Coordinates: 20°37′51″N 105°13′58″W
- Location: Puerto Vallarta, Jalisco, Mexico

Las Glorias Beach (Spanish: "Playa Las Glorias") is a beach in Puerto Vallarta, in the Mexican state of Jalisco. The 3080 ft long (940 meters) beach is between Los Tules Beach and Tranquila Beach. Condominiums and resorts along the beach include Canto del Sol Plaza Vallarta, Dreams Vallarta Bay Resort & Spa, Las Palmas by the Sea, Plaza Pelicanos Grand Beach Resort, and Sunset Plaza Beach Resort.
